The 7th Illinois Cavalry Regiment was a cavalry regiment that served in the Union Army during the American Civil War.

Service
The  7th Illinois Volunteer Cavalry was mustered into service at Camp Butler, Illinois, on October 13, 1861.

After the fall of Vicksburg, the 7th Illinois Cavalry served with the Third Cavalry Brigade of the XVI Army Corps, headquartered at Memphis, Tennessee.  It was camped north of Collierville, Tennessee, when Confederate General James Ronald Chalmers attacked the garrison with 2,500 troops on 11 October 1863.  A portion of the troops circled around the north side of the town and attacked the camp of the 7th Illinois Cavalry and routed them, capturing and burning their supplies. The 7th Illinois Cavalry was able to regain their reputation when General Chalmers repeated the attack on Collierville on 3 November 1863.  The Confederates were repulsed at this second Battle of Collierville by the Union Colonel Edward Hatch, while leading the 7th Illinois Cavalry, the 6th Illinois Cavalry, 2nd Iowa Cavalry and the 1st Illinois Light Artillery.

The regiment was mustered out on October 20, 1865.

Total strength and casualties
The regiment suffered 5 officers and 59 enlisted men who were killed in action or who died of their wounds  and 3 officers and 267 enlisted men who died of disease, for a total of 334 fatalities.

Commanders
 Colonel William Pitt Kellogg - resigned June 1, 1862
 Colonel Edward Prince - mustered out October 15, 1864.
 Colonel John M. Graham - mustered out with the regiment.

See also
 List of Illinois Civil War Units
 Illinois in the American Civil War
 Battle of Collierville

Notes

References
 The Civil War Archive

Units and formations of the Union Army from Illinois
1861 establishments in Illinois
Military units and formations established in 1861
Military units and formations disestablished in 1865